Baygushi is a rural locality (a village) in Vyatkinskoye Rural Settlement, Sudogodsky District, Vladimir Oblast, Russia. The population was 112 as of 2010. There are 7 streets.

Geography 
Baygushi is located 29 km northwest of Sudogda (the district's administrative centre) by road. Vyatkino is the nearest rural locality.

References 

Rural localities in Sudogodsky District